"Eyes That See in the Dark" is a song written by Barry and Maurice Gibb in 1982. It was performed by Kenny Rogers for his 1983 album of the same name. It reached #30 in the US Country Charts, #4 in the US Adult Contemporary Charts, #61 in the United Kingdom and #79 in the Billboard Hot 100.

Recording took place at Middle Ear Studios in Florida Lion Share Recording Studios and Ocean Way Recording in Los Angeles. In the RCA UK, seemed afraid of the full-out country voice of Dolly Parton as it was released as a single before "Islands in the Stream". In the US, this was the third single off the album with "Hold Me" as the B-side.

The guitars were played by Barry Gibb, Maurice Gibb, Tim Renwick and George Terry .

Charts

Weekly charts

Year-end charts

Personnel
 Kenny Rogers — vocals
 Barry Gibb — background vocals, guitar
 Maurice Gibb — bass, guitar, background vocals
 Tim Renwick — guitar
 George Terry — guitar
 George Bitzer – piano, synthesizer
 Albhy Galuten — piano, synthesizer
 Ron Ziegler – drums

Barry Gibb version

"Eyes That See in the Dark" was originally performed by Barry Gibb as a guideline for Kenny Rogers. Months after Gibb recorded demos for Dionne Warwick and Warwick herself recorded  Heartbreaker which was produced by Gibb.

It was recorded in August 1982. This would be the first demo for an album by Rogers, as Gibb and Rogers met later in the year and Rogers asked about some songs. Gibb's version was a power ballad. On this version, Maurice plays second guitar, bass, and a bit of synthesizer.

Personnel
Barry Gibb — lead vocals, guitar
Maurice Gibb — guitar, bass, synthesizer

References

Songs written by Barry Gibb
Songs written by Maurice Gibb
Song recordings produced by Barry Gibb
Barry Gibb songs
Pop ballads
Kenny Rogers songs
1983 singles
1982 songs
1984 singles
RCA Records singles
Song recordings produced by Albhy Galuten